The Town of Gypsum is the home rule municipality that is the most populous municipality in Eagle County, Colorado, United States. The town population was 8,040 at the 2020 United States Census, a +24.13% increase since the 2010 United States Census. Gypsum is a part of the Edwards, CO Micropolitan Statistical Area. Gypsum is the home of an American Gypsum drywall plant and mine.

History 
The town was named for nearby gypsum deposits, and was incorporated in 1911.

Geography 
Gypsum is located in western Eagle County at  (39.644499, -106.940232), in the valley of the Eagle River, a west-flowing tributary of the Colorado River. U.S. Route 6 passes through the center of town, leading east (upriver)  to Eagle, the county seat. Interstate 70 runs along the northern edge of Gypsum, with access from Exit 140. I-70 leads east  to Denver and west  to Grand Junction.

At the 2020 United States Census, the town had a total area of  including  of water.

Demographics

As of the census of 2000, there were 3,654 people, 1,150 households, and 917 families residing in the town. The racial makeup of the town was 81.28% White, 0.16% Black, 1.31% Native American, 0.22% Asian, 0.05% Pacific Islander, 15.00% from other races, and 1.97% from two or more races. Hispanic or Latino of any race were 31.31% of the population.

There were 1,150 households, out of which 51.2% had children under the age of 18 living with them, 68.8% were married couples living together, 6.8% had a female householder with no husband present, and 20.2% were non-families. 12.3% of all households were made up of individuals, and 1.3% had someone living alone who was 65 years of age or older.  The average household size was 3.17 and the average family size was 3.47.

In the town, the population was spread out, with 33.1% under the age of 18, 8.8% from 18 to 24, 38.7% from 25 to 44, 17.2% from 45 to 64, and 2.2% who were 65 years of age or older.  The median age was 30 years. For every 100 females, there were 110.2 males.  For every 100 females age 18 and over, there were 109.7 males.

The median income for a household in the town was $59,671, and the median income for a family was $62,384. Males had a median income of $40,139 versus $29,764 for females. The per capita income for the town was $21,790.  About 4.4% of families and 5.5% of the population were below the poverty line, including 6.4% of those under age 18 and 9.0% of those age 65 or over.

Infrastructure

Transportation 
Gypsum is the location of the Eagle County Regional Airport (EGE), a popular regional airport used in the winter to transport skiers to nearby Vail,  to the east.

Gypsum is also the location of several ECO (Eagle County Public Transportation) stops, there are stops at Jules Dr, Eagle Valley High School, Eagle County Regional Airport, Cooley Mesa Rd, and Navajo Rd. $1 fee for youth and $4 fee for adults, and for the elderly, a $1 fee.

Education 

 Eagle Valley High School
 Gypsum Creek Middle School 
 Red Hill Elementary School
 Gypsum Elementary School

American Gypsum 

The largest industry in the town is American Gypsum's (formerly Centex and before that, Eagle Gypsum Limited) drywall plant. The facility produces a variety of wallboard products, which is shipped by both rail and truck. The company also operates an open pit gypsum mine in the hills north of town. The mine currently in operation is the second to have been located in the area. Its grade is quickly dropping, and the company intends to close and reclaim it soon. A new mine, roughly a mile away, has been permitted, and is currently in the development stage. Unlike most surface mines, which utilize drill and blast methods to recover material, the Eagle mine uses machines similar to pavement mills (Wirtgen 2200 SM Surface Miners) to cut  swaths through the relatively soft rock. Front-end loaders then sort the material by color (white is gypsum, brown is waste) and load it into trucks to be hauled either to the plant or to waste piles (although recently, some of the waste has been used to construct the haul-road to the new mine).

Climate
This climate type is dominated by the winter season, a long, bitterly cold period with short, clear days, relatively little precipitation mostly in the form of snow, and low humidity.  According to the Köppen Climate Classification system, Gypsum has a subarctic climate, abbreviated "Dfc" on climate maps.

See also

Colorado
Bibliography of Colorado
Index of Colorado-related articles
Outline of Colorado
List of counties in Colorado
List of municipalities in Colorado
List of places in Colorado
List of statistical areas in Colorado
Edwards-Glenwood Springs, CO Combined Statistical Area
Edwards, CO Micropolitan Statistical Area

References

External links

Town of Gypsum website
CDOT map of the Town of Gypsum

Towns in Eagle County, Colorado
Towns in Colorado